Igboid languages constitute a branch of the Volta–Niger language family. The subgroups are:
Ekpeye
 Nuclear Igboid: Igbo, Ikwerre, Ika, Ngwa, Izii–Ikwo–Ezza–Mgbo, Ogba,Ishiagu and Ukwuani-Aboh-Ndoni
Williamson and Blench conclude that the Nuclear Igboid languages (Igboid apart from Ekpeye) form a "language cluster" and that they are somewhat mutually intelligible.
 However, mutual intelligibility is only marginal, even among the Izii–Ikwo–Ezaa–Mgbo languages.
Igboid speakers are about 60 million people.

Names and locations
Below is a list of language names, populations, and locations from Blench (2019).

See also
List of Proto-Igboid reconstructions (Wiktionary)

References

Blench, Roger. 2016. A reconstruction of the phonology of proto-Igboid.

 
Volta–Niger languages